The Pingat Pentadbiran Awam (Civil Administration Medal) ranks fourth in the Sarawak State Orders, Decorations and Medals list. The medal was instituted in 1973, to recognize exemplary service in Civil Service.

In 1988, another two were added to the ranks, which is the 'Meritorious Service Medal' and 'Commendable Service Medal'. The 'Companion' rank was added to the list in 2010.

The medals are divided into four ranks:

External links
 Photos of the Sarawak State Orders, Decorations and Medals (Public Relations and Corporate Affairs Unit, Sarawak Chief Minister's Department)

Orders, decorations, and medals of Sarawak